Willem Cornelisz Schouten ( – 1625) was a Dutch navigator for the Dutch East India Company. He was the first to sail the Cape Horn route to the Pacific Ocean.

Biography 

Willem Cornelisz Schouten was born in c. 1567 in Hoorn, Holland, Seventeen Provinces.

On July 1, 1615 Willem Cornelisz Schouten and his younger brother Jan Schouten  sailed from Texel in the Netherlands, in an expedition led by Jacob Le Maire and sponsored by Isaac Le Maire and his Australische Compagnie in equal shares with Schouten.  The expedition consisted of two ships: Eendracht and Hoorn. A main purpose of the voyage was to search for Terra Australis. A further objective was to explore a western route to the Pacific Ocean to evade the trade restrictions of the Dutch East India Company (VOC) in the  Spice Islands. In 1616 Schouten rounded Cape Horn, which he named after the recently destroyed ship Hoorn, and the Dutch city of Hoorn, after which the lost ship was named, the town in which Schouten himself was born. Schouten named the strait itself "Le Maire Strait". Jan Schouten died on 9 March 1616 after the expedition left Juan Fernández. He crossed the Pacific along a southern role, discovering a number of atolls in the Tuamotu Islands, including Puka-Puka, Manihi, Rangiroa and Takapoto, followed by Tafahi, Niuafoʻou and Niuatoputapu in the Tonga Islands, and Alofi and Futuna in the Wallis and Futuna Islands. He then followed the north coasts of New Ireland and New Guinea and visited adjacent islands, including what became known as the Schouten Islands before reaching Ternate in September 1616. The Eendracht completed the navigation and returned to the Netherlands on July 1, 1617.

Although he had opened an unknown route (south of Cape Horn) for the Dutch, the VOC claimed infringement of its monopoly of trade to the Spice Islands. Schouten was arrested (and later released) and his ship confiscated in Java. On his return he would sail again for the VOC, and on one of these trips he died off the coast of Madagascar in 1625.

Abel Tasman later used Schouten's charts during his exploration of the north coast of New Guinea.

First publications

Schouten described his travels in the Journal, published in a Dutch edition at Amsterdam in 1618 and soon translated into several other languages.
 Dutch edition: . Amsterdam: Willem Jansz. 1618.
 French edition:  ... Amsterdam: Willem Jansz. 1618.
 English edition: The Relation of a Wonderfull Voiage made by Willem Cornelison Schouten of Horne. Shewing how South from the Straights of Magelan in Terra Delfuego: he found and discovered a newe passage through the great South Seaes, and that way sayled round about the world. London: Imprinted by T.D. for Nathanaell Newbery. 1619.
 German edition:  ... Frankfurt am Main. 1619.
 Latin edition: ... Amsterdam: Janson. 1619.

Among historians, including A. L. Rowse, there is no consensus about the authorship of this Journal. Schouten has got the credit for it, and thus the voyage has come down to us under his name. The Dutch, French, German and Latin texts all have nine engraved maps and plates, which are not present in the English version, The Relation of a Wonderfull Voiage.

Notes and footnotes

References
 Barreveld, Dirk J. Tegen De Heeren Van De VOC – Isaac Le Maire En De Ontdekking Van Kaap Hoorn. The Hague: Sdu Publishers. Uitgeverij 2002.
 Bolyanatz, Alexander H. "Where Is Claes Pietersz Bay? An Episode in the History of the Sursurunga of New Ireland", in Ethnohistory 45:2 (1998), p. 319–47
 Edward Duyker (ed.) Mirror of the Australian Navigation by Jacob Le Maire: A Facsimile of the ‘Spieghel der Australische Navigatie ...’ Being an Account of the Voyage of Jacob Le Maire and Willem Schouten 1615–1616 published in Amsterdam in 1622, Hordern House for the Australian National Maritime Museum, Sydney, 1999, pp. 202, .

External links
 Bartelds, Schouten, Willem Cornelisz., in Nieuw Nederlandsch biografisch woordenboek, vol. 7, A.W. Sijthoff, Leiden 1927. pp. 1117–18. (in Dutch)
 

1560s births
1625 deaths
17th-century Dutch explorers
Circumnavigators of the globe
Explorers of Australia
Dutch explorers of the Pacific
Explorers of New Guinea
People from Hoorn
Schouten Islands
Dutch East India Company people